Cirrhicera conspicua is a species of beetle in the family Cerambycidae, and is a part of the subfamily Lamiinae. It was described by Gahan in 1892. It is commonly found in Mexico.

References

Hemilophini
Beetles described in 1892